Mineral Township is one of twenty-five townships in Barry County, Missouri, United States. As of the 2000 census, its population was 886.

Geography
It contains three cemeteries: Ennis, Pierce and Snyder.

The streams of Fortune Branch, Rockhouse Creek and Williams Branch run through this township.

Transportation
Mineral Township contains one airport or landing strip, Timber Line Airpark.

References

 USGS Geographic Names Information System (GNIS)

External links
 US-Counties.com
 City-Data.com

Townships in Barry County, Missouri
Townships in Missouri